Full Circle is the debut and only studio album of Los Angeles-based electronic music duo Oliver. It was released on August 25, 2017, via Interscope Records. It is the duo's final album, after Vaughn Oliver announced that no plans have been set for the future, and states that though he and Goldstein are on good terms, they haven't worked on music for over a year since then.

Background 
Billboard described the opener as "a '70s sci-fi movie with a cinematic, moody intro called 'Portrait' that melts into the sleek synth-porn of 'Ottomatic'." The album features collaborations with De La Soul, Chromeo, Sam Sparro, MNDR, Elohim, Yelle, Leon Else and Scott Mellis. Oligee Goldstein from Oliver, said:

Singles 
"Heart Attack" and "Chemicals" were released as the first and second singles respectively.

Track listing 
Adapted from iTunes.

References 

Interscope Records albums
2017 debut albums
Oliver (DJs) albums